McConnon is a surname. Notable people with the surname include:

Jim McConnon (1922–2003), English cricketer
Leigh McConnon (born 1953), Australian rules footballer